Wheaton station is a Washington Metro station in Montgomery County, Maryland on the Red Line. The station serves the suburb of Wheaton, and is located at the intersection of Georgia Avenue (Maryland Route 97) and Reedie Drive. The station contains  escalators, which are the longest set of single-span escalators in the Western Hemisphere.

Service at Wheaton began on September 22, 1990, and it was the northeastern end of the Red Line for nearly eight years, until the Glenmont station opened in July 1998.

Notable place nearby 
 Westfield Wheaton (formerly Wheaton Plaza)

Station layout

The trip takes approximately 2 minutes and 45 seconds. There are two elevators leading into the station's parking garage at the Reedie Drive entrance, while the entrance at the bus bay is at ground level. Inside the station, there is one elevator leading from the mezzanine to the Shady Grove bound side of the platform.

This station, along with Forest Glen station farther south, has separate tunnels and platforms for each direction, instead of the large, vaulted common room seen at most other underground stations in the Metro system; this design, which is similar to many of the London Underground's tube stations, was used to save money due to the station's depth.  This design is also common at mostly all underground stations on the NFTA Metro in Buffalo, NY.

References

External links
 

 Reedie Drive entrance from Google Maps Street View
 This station is the likely setting of this XKCD cartoon

Bus stations in Maryland
Stations on the Red Line (Washington Metro)
Railway stations in Montgomery County, Maryland
Washington Metro stations in Maryland
Railway stations in the United States opened in 1990
Railway stations located underground in Maryland
1990 establishments in Maryland
Wheaton, Maryland